Jimmy Patelis is an American politician serving as a Republican member of the Montana House of Representatives from the 52nd district. He was elected in November 2020, and assumed office on January 4, 2021. He was also elected in November 2016, and served in the Montana House of Representatives from 2017 to 2019.

Early life and education 
Patelis was born in Bethlehem, Pennsylvania. He received a football scholarship to Montana Technological University, where he earned a Bachelor of Science degree in society and technology.

Career 
Patelis worked as a probation officer for 25 years before retiring. He was elected to the Montana House of Representatives in November 2020 and assumed office on January 4, 2021, succeeding Rodney Garcia.

References

Year of birth missing (living people)
Living people
Montana Tech Orediggers football players
Republican Party members of the Montana House of Representatives
People from Bethlehem, Pennsylvania